Events from the year 1451 in Ireland.

Incumbent
Lord: Henry VI

Events
Rathmacknee Castle believed to have been built by John Rosseter (Rossiter, Rositer, Rosceter), seneschal of the Liberty of Wexford.

Deaths
 Murcadh Ó Madadhan, Chief of Síol Anmchadha.
 Margaret O'Connor, better known by her maiden name Margaret O'Carroll.

References